The Everlasting Whisper is a 1925 American silent Western film directed by John G. Blystone and written by Wyndham Gittens. It is based on the 1922 novel The Everlasting Whisper, a Tale of the California Wilderness by Jackson Gregory. The film stars Tom Mix, Alice Calhoun, Robert Cain, George Berrell, Walter James and Virginia Madison. The film was released on October 11, 1925, by Fox Film Corporation.

Cast     
 Tom Mix as Mark King
 Alice Calhoun as Gloria Gaynor
 Robert Cain as Gratton
 George Berrell as Old Honeycutt
 Walter James as Aswin Brody
 Virginia Madison as Mrs. Gaynor
 Karl Dane as Jarrold
 Tony the Horse as Mark's Horse

References

External links

 

1925 films
1925 Western (genre) films
Fox Film films
Films directed by John G. Blystone
American black-and-white films
Silent American Western (genre) films
1920s English-language films
1920s American films